Berlin Alexanderplatz is a German railway station in the Mitte district of Berlin's city centre. It is one of the busiest transport hubs in the Berlin area. The station takes its name from its location on Alexanderplatz, near the Fernsehturm and the World Clock.

Overview
Like other long-distance stations, Alexanderplatz is also a shopping centre for selling merchandise to travellers. Due to its importance and central location, it is a site where tourists regularly change. Alexanderplatz thereby became the second major hub of the Berlin U-Bahn network, behind Nollendorfplatz station.

Four Regional-Express and Regionalbahn lines, as well as S-Bahn lines S3, S5, S7, and S9, call at the overground station. The adjacent underground station is one of the largest on the Berlin U-Bahn network, with lines U2, U5, and U8 stopping there. The station is also served by four tram lines, as well as four bus lines during the day and many night bus lines.

History

Alexanderplatz station opened on 7 February 1882 on the Berlin Stadtbahn viaduct from Charlottenburg to Ostbahnhof (then named Schlesischer Bahnhof). In 1926, the station hall, spanning two platforms with four tracks, was rebuilt in its present plain style. Heavily damaged in World War II, train service at the station resumed on 4 November 1945, while the reconstruction of the hall continued until 1951.

The first station of the present U-Bahn line U2, designed by Alfred Grenander, entered service on 1 July 1913; the station was then the eastern terminus of Berlin's second line from Potsdamer Platz via Spittelmarkt. The platforms of lines U8 and U5 opened on 18 April 1930 and 21 December 1930 respectively, also built according to Grenander's conception, but in a distinct Modern style. The U2 station was also renovated after the Alexanderplatz fire in 1972.

The eastern entrances were destroyed on 15 March 1945.

The U8 station was also a ghost station during the division of Berlin from 13 August 1961 to 1 July 1990. The stationmaster's offices were also built; these were shifted and walls were removed. The entrance at Dirksenstraße had to be made accessible again, just like the connecting stairs to the mall and to the platforms of Line E. Besides that, the intercommunication staircase was also built towards Line E so that it would go through the dimly lit platforms. Stainallee was renamed a few months after the closure of the stairs. In all cases, the U-Bahn stations had to be recognizable as such on the surface. The U-Bahn logo has been removed in recent years. The station also had to undergo renovation works from 17 May to 30 June 1990 before the full reopening on 1 July 1990.

The U2 station was renovated between January and March 2001. The U5 station was renovated between February 2003 and September 2004; it was the western terminus of the line from 1930 to December 2020, when it was extended to Berlin Hauptbahnhof.

Train services
The station is served by the following services:

Regional services  Magdeburg – Brandenburg – Potsdam – Berlin – Erkner – Fürstenwalde – Frankfurt (Oder) (– Cottbus)
Regional services  Wismar – Schwerin – Wittenberge – Nauen – Berlin – Königs Wusterhausen – Lübben – Cottbus
Regional services  Dessau – Bad Belzig – Michendorf – Berlin – Berlin-Schönefeld Airport – Wünsdorf-Waldstadt
Local services  Nauen – Falkensee – Berlin – Berlin-Schönefeld Airport
Berlin S-Bahn services  Spandau – Westkreuz – Hauptbahnhof – Alexanderplatz – Ostbahnhof – Karlshorst – Köpenick – Erkner
Berlin S-Bahn services  Westkreuz – Hauptbahnhof – Alexanderplatz – Ostbahnhof – Lichtenberg – Strausberg Nord
Berlin S-Bahn services  Potsdam – Wannsee – Westkreuz – Hauptbahnhof – Alexanderplatz – Ostbahnhof – Lichtenberg – Ahrensfelde
Berlin S-Bahn services  Spandau - Westkreuz - Hauptbahnhof - Alexanderplatz - Ostbahnhof - Schöneweide - Flughafen Schönefeld

Gallery

References

U2 (Berlin U-Bahn) stations
U5 (Berlin U-Bahn) stations
U8 (Berlin U-Bahn) stations
Alexanderplatz
Alexanderplatz
Alexanderplatz
Railway stations in Germany opened in 1882
Transit centers in Germany